Cryptolaria is a genus of hydrozoans in the family Zygophylacidae.

Species 
The following species are recognized in the genus:

 Cryptolaria exserta Busk, 1858
 Cryptolaria pectinata (Allman, 1888)
 Cryptolaria prima Busk, 1858
 Cryptolaria rigida (Fraser, 1942)
 Cryptolaria spinosa Millard, 1980

References

External links 

 

Zygophylacidae
Hydrozoan genera